Ukhta State Technical University is a unique representative of Russian oil and gas universities and one of the largest technical higher education institutions of the European North of Russia. The University was founded on the basis of the Ukhta Industrial Institute (the Institute was founded in 1967). By this time, more than 25000 engineers and economists had graduated in oil, geology, building, and timber industry majors. After the successful attestation on  April 14, 1999, the Institute was granted a status of a State Technical University.

Campus 
Ukhta State Technical University has a campus with over 7,000 undergraduate and graduate students living in its buildings. University campus consists of:
 USTU buildings (“A”, “B”, “V”, “G”,  “D”,  “E”, “K”,  “L”, “N”)
 Forest College
 Mining and Petroleum College
 Sports complex Burevestnik 
 Production-and-Training Center "GAZPROM TRANSGAZ UKHTA"
 Business Incubator
 Training Ground
 Dormitories (14 buildings)
 Medical Service
 Dining facilities
 Recreational center "Krokhal"
 Library
 Swimming Pool

Institutes 
 Institute of Geology, Oil and Gas Production and Pipeline Transportation
 Institute of Civil Building and Engineering 
 Institute of Economics, Management and Information Technology
 Institute of Advanced Training
 Institute of Industry

Programs of higher education
 Bachelor:
 Ecology and Management of Natural Resources;
 Architecture;
 Construction (Civil Engineering);
 Computer Science and Engineering;
 Information Systems and Technologies;
 Power and Electrical Engineering;
 Mechanical Engineering (Technological machines and equipment);
 Technosphere Safety;
 Oil and Gas Engineering;
 Land-utilization and Cadastral Register;
 Standardization and Metrology;
 Technology of Timber Cutting and Timber Processing Industries;
 Economics;
 Management;
 Advertising and Public Relations;
 Document studies and Archives;
 Physical Training;
 Specialist:
 Applied Geology;
 Technologies of Geological Exploring
 Master:
 Construction (Civil Engineering):
 «Theory of designing buildings and structures»
 «Architectural and Construction Materials»
 «Heat and gas supply settlements and enterprises»
 «Urban and industrial enterprises water supply»	
 Power and Electrical Engineering:
 «Automated electromechanical complexes and systems»
 Mechanical Engineering (Technological machines and equipment):
 «Machines and Equipment for Forestry»;
 «Machines and equipment for oil and gas fields»
 Technosphere Safety:
 «Safety of technological processes and production of oil and gas industry»
 Oil and Gas Engineering:
 «Horizontal drilling»
 «Drilling mud practices»
 «Drilling Fluid Engineering»
 «Development of oil fields»
 «Reliability of oil pipelines and oil storage»
 «Development and exploration hydrocarbon fields with horizontal wells in the Arctic shelf»
 «Reliability of pipeline systems of the Arctic shelf»
 Technology of Timber Cutting and Timber Processing Industries:
 «Forest Engineering»
 Management:
 «Industrial Management»

Academic year 
The academic year is divided into two semesters. The first semester usually runs from September to December, the second from February to June, with breaks in early January for Christmas holidays and a summer holiday running throughout July and August.

Student life
USTU students participate in various areas of extracurricular activities. These are social, political, and cultural and educational projects.

Student organizations
 English Club
KVN Club: Originally KVN is a Russian humour TV show and competition where teams (usually college and university students) compete by giving funny answers to questions and showing prepared sketches. For more than 20 years TV broadcasts of KVN games receive the highest ratings in Russia. The popularity of the game is so high that more than 100 cities play game of KVN now. 
The Ukhta University has got several KVN teams, which compete between each other. But sometimes KVN teams come to Ukhta from different town of the Komi Republic to take part in the KVN competition.

Arts and culture activities
Afro-Dance Studio
Angolah Dance Studio
Duet
Ensemble Radost
Nargiz
Poetry Club
Theater
United Bit

International relations
The university has a number of relationships with schools all over the world.  It has set up several projects in cooperation with schools abroad such as University of Nordland, Oulu University of Applied Sciences, Freiberg University of Mining and Technology, University of Tromsø, Riga Technical University, Univerzitet u Novom Sadu, Duquesne University, Technical University of Ostrava and other. It is a member of the University of the Arctic network.

Branches 
There are 2 branches of the USTU in the Komi Republic.
 Branch in Vorkuta
 Branch in Usinsk

References

Buildings and structures in the Komi Republic
Universities in Russia
1958 establishments in Russia
Educational institutions established in 1958
Public universities and colleges in Russia
Technical universities and colleges in Russia